Aindrais MacMarcuis, Irish poet, fl. c. 1608.

MacMarcuis is mainly known for This Night Sees Ireland Desolate, a lament concerning the Flight of the Earls. John Montague published a version of it in the Faber Book of Irish Verse in 1974.

References

 The Faber Book of Irish Verse, pp. 122–123, ed. John Montague, London, 1974.

Irish poets
Irish-language poets
17th-century Irish writers
17th-century Irish poets